Gaetano Marco "Guy" Nardulli (born May 31, 1974 in Norridge, Illinois) is an American actor and producer who is most associated for his character role as a street fighter turned MMA professional fighter in the 2006 movie -And Then It Breaks with actress Anne Dudek. The Horror Vault Vol.1 (2008), which was released as a compilation of nine horror short stories  contains the 2005 movie short thriller Alone in which Nardulli plays Detective Wiley. Guy is well known for his "strong-arm" portrayals as detective and law enforcement characters, military, mobster and criminal roles in movies and television. His most recent television work is related with the 2015 television series The Last Ship in two episodes,  "Long Day's Journey" and "Alone and Unafraid". Guy also appears in a reoccurring role on Criminal Minds as Detective Walker. He was nominated for Best Supporting Actor for the 2013 Utah Film Awards for his role as Antonio Sorrento for Proper Manors. Nardulli also received a second nomination as part of the Best Ensemble Nomination, also for Proper Manors.

Early life
Nardulli went to Ridgewood H.S, Then was a collegiate football player for Elmhurst College and a two-time All-American for the Bluejay football team He traveled to Italy and played football on the Italian Football League with the Bolzano Giants during the 1996/97 season. He returned to the States and played on the Regional Football League with the Ohio Cannons and then the Quad City Steamwheelers during the 1998 season and returned to his hometown to play with Chicago Thunder Football League  He later joined the Chippendales dance troupe and then made his way into the acting industry, auditioning for roles in television and film.

Television series
General Hospital (2004-2016) as Pete Inglis / Sonny's Goon / Policeman
House M.D. (2006) Policeman (coughing cop)
Without a Trace (2008) as Local Cop
Criminal Minds - The Crossing (2008) TV episode - Undercover Cop
Monk (2008) as Officer Spumante
CSI: NY (2008) as Vincent
Undercovers (2010) as Tony
How I Met Your Mother (2012) as Vinny
Proper Manors (2012-2014) as Antonio Sorrento (5 episodes)
Vegas (2013) as Paul Zummo
Justified (2013) as Gun Thug
Revenge (2013) as Security Officer DiMayo
Criminal Minds - The Edge of Winter (2014) TV episode - Detective Walker
Castle (2014) as Bodyguard
The Mamaluke (2014) as Eddie (2 episodes)
The Last Ship (2015) as Giovanni (2 episodes)
Where the Bears Are (2015) as Jimmy Delvecchio
Real Rob (2015) as Guy
Rush Hour (2016) as King
Days of Our Lives (2017) as Gio
Starwood U (2017) as Coach Revere
S.W.A.T. (2018) as Uni Officer #2
Millennial Mafia (2018) as Second Attacker
Dirt (2018) as Jason (2 episodes)
SuperHeroes In Therapy (2018) as Superman
The Bold and the Beautiful (2019) as Vincent/Thug #2
Starwood University (2020) as Coach Rex
Why Women Kill (2021) as Sid Hemple
All American (2021) as Referee

Daytime drama
Passions (2004-2006) as Giancarlo (3 episodes)
General Hospital (2004-2005) as Pete Inglis (8 episodes)
The Young and the Restless (2004) as Thug #1 (3 episodes, uncredited)
The Bold and the Beautiful (2018-2019) as Vincent (7 episodes)

Film
32 Seconds (2014) as Jerry (short)
Alone (2005) as Detective Wiley (short)
Any Day (2015) as Wayne
And Then It Breaks (2006) as Guy
Caught in the Game (2009) as Mr. Goldstein
I'll Never Hurt You (2014) as Jerry (short)
Jekyll (2007) as Policeman (uncredited)
Lost in Reality (2014) as Mark (short)
Made of Honor (2008) as Basketball Player (uncredited)
No Intent (2013) as Detective Testa (short)
The Devil's in the Details (2013) as Bryan
The Intruders (2009) as Trendo Fox 
The Big Lug (2013) as Hardknocks Hype Man (short)
The Power of Liquor (2010) as Dustin (short)
The Road to Canyon Lake (2005) as Dino
United 300 (2007) as Spartan (short)

Compilation films
The Horror Vault Vol. 1 (2008) as Detective Wiley (segment "Alone")

Video games and voice over
L.A. Noire (2011) as Edward Hemmings (video game, voice)

Works as a producer in film
Lost in Reality (2014) - Producer (short)
No Intent (2013) - Producer (short)

Writing credits
Lost in Reality (2014) (short)

References

External links
http://m.imdb.com/name/nm1742300

Male actors from Chicago
American male film actors
American male television actors
American people of Italian descent
Living people
All-American college football players
1974 births